Warren Goodhind (born 16 August 1977) is a South African football coach and former professional player. He is currently assistant manager at Combined Counties Premier Division club Southall.

He played as a right back. Active primarily in England, Goodhind made over 200 appearances in the Football League for four clubs between 1996 and 2007, before beginning his non-League football career, retiring in 2012.

Career
Born in Johannesburg, Goodhind began his career with Barnet. He also played in the Football League for Cambridge United, Rochdale and Oxford United, before playing non-League football with a number of clubs including Ebbsfleet United and Harrow Borough, before spending three years with Eastleigh. Goodhind left Eastleigh in 2011, and after a spell with Hemel Hempstead Town, signed for Thurrock in December 2011.

References

1977 births
Living people
South African soccer players
Barnet F.C. players
Cambridge United F.C. players
Rochdale A.F.C. players
Oxford United F.C. players
Ebbsfleet United F.C. players
Harrow Borough F.C. players
Eastleigh F.C. players
Hemel Hempstead Town F.C. players
Thurrock F.C. players
English Football League players
Isthmian League players
National League (English football) players
White South African people
Sportspeople from Johannesburg

Association football fullbacks